Bryan M'Bango (born 13 February 1991 in Reims, France) is a French footballer who played on the professional level for French Ligue 2 club SC Bastia during the 2008–2010 seasons.

References

French footballers
1991 births
Sportspeople from Reims
Living people
Association football defenders
SC Bastia players
Footballers from Grand Est
21st-century French people